Gauche Socialiste is an officially recognised faction within the political party Quebec solidaire and an affiliate of the reunified Fourth International.

Origins 

It was formed in 1983 by Trotskyists who left or were expelled from the Revolutionary Workers League/Ligue Ouvrière Révolutionnaire when the group turned away from Trotskyism in the early 1980s. Gauche Socialiste members had previously been in the Organisation Combat Socialiste, which existed from 1980 to 1982, and were briefly part of the Mouvement socialiste, which was founded in 1981.
Gauche Socialiste is the Quebec section of the reunified Fourth International. The group publishes the periodical La Gauche. The group's counterpart in English Canada was Socialist Challenge which later joined the New Socialist Group and forms a Fourth International Caucus within it.

In 2002, Gauche Socialiste participated in the creation of the Union des forces progressistes (UFP) and subsequently in 2006 supported the creation of Quebec solidaire through the merger of the UFP and Option citoyenne. In 2007, GS was one of two groups to receive party recognition as a collective (faction).

References

External links
 La Politique québécoise sur le Web
Marxist Organizations in Quebec Since the Early 1970s: Our Continuity

Communism in Quebec
Trotskyist organizations in Canada
Fourth International (post-reunification)
Provincial political parties in Quebec
Political parties established in 1983
Political party factions in Canada